Claudette Annette Rogers Robinson ( Rogers; born June 20, 1942) is an American singer, best known as a member of the vocal group The Miracles from 1957 to 1972. Her brother Emerson "Sonny" Rogers was a founding member of the group, which before 1957 was named "The Matadors". Claudette replaced her brother in the group after he was drafted into the U.S. Army.

In 2012, Claudette was inducted into the Rock and Roll Hall of Fame with the rest of the original Miracles, including her cousin Bobby Rogers, Pete Moore, Ronald White, and Marv Tarplin. She was inducted alongside her former husband, Miracles lead singer Smokey Robinson.

Biography 

Claudette Rogers and Smokey Robinson were married on November 7, 1959. Smokey and Claudette had plans to raise a family, but the rough music touring life caused Claudette to have seven miscarriages.

Smokey Robinson co-wrote the number-one Motown single "My Girl" with Miracles member Ronald White in dedication to Claudette, a song performed most notably by The Temptations. The song was originally intended to be recorded by The Miracles.

The Robinsons have two children, and both have Motown-referenced names: Berry William Borope Robinson was named after label chief Berry Gordy with his first middle name, "William", in honor of his father (William "Smokey" Robinson), and his second middle name in honor of fellow Miracles group mates Bobby (Rogers), Ronnie (White) and Pete (Moore), and Tamla Claudette Robinson was named after Motown's original record label, Tamla Records. with her middle name "Claudette", after her mother.

Smokey Robinson and Claudette were divorced in 1986, after 27 years of marriage. Motown founder Berry Gordy gave Claudette the official title of the "First Lady of Motown", as noted in his autobiography, because, as a member of the Miracles, Motown's first group and first recording act, she was the first female artist ever signed to a Motown-affiliated record label (Tamla). Several years ago, Claudette began writing her autobiography, A Miraculous Life, a book of her memoirs, and of her life with the Miracles. Robinson is a board member of the national Rhythm & Blues Foundation and the HAL Awards. Her cousin, original Miracles member Bobby Rogers toured with the last incarnation of the Miracles throughout the United States, Canada and Europe, until his death in 2013. Claudette still performs and makes selected appearances with the Miracles. Claudette can be seen on stage with the Miracles live at the Apollo Theatre in a rare 1962 film clip on the 2006 Motown/Universal DVD release, Smokey Robinson & the Miracles: The Definitive Performances. She can also be seen onstage with original Miracles, Smokey Robinson, her cousin Bobby Rogers, Pete Moore, and Marv Tarplin (but not Ronnie White) on the DVD release of The "Motown 25" Television Special.

2023 biofilm 

The First Lady of Motown: The Claudette Robinson Story, is a biographical documentary of the life and career of Claudette Robinson, including her years as a founding member of The Miracles. It is scheduled for a 2023 release and is currently in post-production.
It includes interviews with her former husband, Smokey Robinson, their children, Berry and Tamla Robinson, Motown founder Berry Gordy, Mary Wilson of The Supremes, Martha Reeves of Martha and the Vandellas, Kim Weston, Jayne Kennedy and more. It includes archive footage of deceased Miracles: Ronnie White, Pete Moore, Marv Tarplin, and her cousin, Bobby Rogers.

Rock Hall of Fame controversy and 2012 Miracles induction 
In 1987, Smokey Robinson was inducted into the Rock and Roll Hall of Fame as a solo artist. However, in a controversial decision, the other original members of the Miracles—Bobby Rogers, Ronnie White, Pete Moore, Marv Tarplin, and Claudette Robinson—were not.

In 2012, it was finally announced that, after a 26-year wait, Claudette Robinson would be automatically and retroactively inducted with the rest of the Miracles into the Rock and Roll Hall of Fame alongside Miracles lead singer Smokey Robinson.

Awards 

Claudette and the original members of The Miracles were honored with a star on the Hollywood Walk of Fame on March 20, 2009.
Berry Gordy's Motown Record Corporation's signature act; their first Group, and their first million selling act was the Miracles.
Without the Miracles there would be no Motown, quoted Berry Gordy, March 20, 2009
Without The Miracles there would be no Stevie Wonder, quoted Stevie Wonder, March 20, 2009
Gold & Platinum Record (Single & Album) Awards (Sales of more than 500,000 or 1,000,000 units)
Worldwide over 60 million records sold.
26 of the Miracles single releases reached the Top 10 Billboard R&B Charts
Four of the Miracles songs reached #1 on Billboard R&B Charts
16 releases of the Miracles' recordings reached the Top 20 of Billboard's Hot 100 List with 7 Top 10s, and 2 Pop #1's ("The Tears of a Clown" and "Love Machine").
A third song, The Miracles' first million-seller "Shop Around", reached #1 on the Cash Box Magazine "Top 100" Pop Chart.
Four time inductees Grammy Hall of Fame. (The most of any Motown group.)
Doo-Wop Hall of Fame Inductees.
Triple induction Rock and Roll Hall of Fame's "500 Best" song List.
Double recipient of the prestigious "Heroes and Legends" Award.
Rhythm & Blues Foundation "Pioneer Award" winners .
Vocal Group Hall of Fame Induction & Award.
Spirit of Detroit Award
Rolling Stone Magazine named the Miracles # 32 in their list of The 100 Greatest Rock n' Roll Artists" of All Time. (The highest-ranking Motown group on the Rolling Stone listing).
Billboard Magazine & VH1 list the Miracles among "The 100 Greatest Artists of All Time".
Under the terms of the National Recording Preservation Act of 2000, the Library's National Recording Preservation Board announced the Miracles' million seller, "Tracks of My Tears" being "culturally, historically, and aesthetically significant" to preserve for all time in the United States Library of Congress.
Miracles Boulevard and Miracles Park, Detroit, Michigan (Woodbridge Estates) named for and in honor of Motown group "The Miracles" .
Governor of the state of Michigan, Certificate of Tribute and recognition of the Miracles and their importance to the state of Michigan and the city of Detroit for tremendous accomplishments in the music industry.
Mayor of Detroit Proclamation to The Miracles for a Lifetime of history making accomplishments in music.
Resolution Award, the Detroit City Council gave the Highest Honor they can present to the Miracles for 5 decades of unchallenged achievements in the music industry.
City of Beverly Hills, California, Beverly Hills Mayor & City Council Proclamation recognizing the Miracles contributions to the music industry and American Culture.
The Miracles received a star on the Hollywood Walk of Fame on March 20, 2009.
The Miracles Day in Hollywood, March 20, 2009.Goldmine Magazine'' names The Miracles one of the "20 Greatest Doo-Wop Groups of All Time" .
The Miracles were retroactively inducted into the Rock and Roll Hall of Fame in 2012 alongside Smokey Robinson.

References

External links 

 The Official First Lady of Motown – Claudette Robinson Website
 
 KLEAN Radio interview with Claudette Robinson and son Berry Robinson on YouTube

African-American women singers
American soul musicians
The Miracles members
1942 births
Living people
Musicians from Detroit
Motown artists
American women singers
American sopranos